The Maquoketa River is a tributary of the Mississippi River, approximately  long, in northeastern Iowa in the United States. Its watershed covers  within a rural region of rolling hills and farmland southwest of Dubuque. It is not to be confused with the Little Maquoketa River, another distinct direct tributary of the Upper Mississippi River meeting the Big River north of Dubuque. The river and its tributaries mark the border of the Driftless Area of Iowa, with the areas east of it not having been covered by ice during the last ice age. Its name derives from Maquaw-Autaw, which means "Bear River" in Meskwaki.

Course
It flows briefly northeastward, then generally southeastward through Clayton, Delaware, Jones and Jackson Counties, through Backbone State Park and the towns of Dundee, Manchester and Monticello.

At Maquoketa, it receives the North Fork Maquoketa River from the north; the North Fork rises in northern Dubuque County and flows  generally southward past Dyersville and Cascade.  The Maquoketa then flows generally eastward in a meandering course as it approaches the Mississippi. It enters Pool 13 of the Mississippi from the southwest in eastern Jackson County a few miles upstream from Sabula approximately 30 mi (48 km) southeast of Dubuque.

The river is considered one of the best smallmouth bass and trout fisheries in Iowa.

Dams
There are four small dams on the river:
 Delhi Dam (the USGS terms it, Hartwick Dam) impounds  Lake Delhi downriver from Manchester in Delaware County. On Saturday July 24, 2010, the dam at Lake Delhi failed due to heavy rains and the rapid rise of the Maquoketa River.  The dam has since been reconstructed.
 The Mon-Maq dam in Jones County just east of Monticello was once used to generate power for the town and is now a candidate for dam removal
 The Backbone Lake dam in Backbone State Park.
 The Lakehurst dam at Maquoketa.

Recreation
The stretch of river from just below the Mon-Maq dam to Iowa Highway 136 is one of Iowa's most popular canoe trips.  Along much of this stretch, the river flows through a canyon bounded by steep cliffs of Silurian dolomite.  Large tracts of surrounding land are open to the public, including the Pictured Rocks Wildlife Management Area (1,138 acres, cooperatively managed by Jones County and the Iowa DNR, and the Indian Bluffs Primitive Area State Preserve (845 acres, privately owned, managed by the Iowa DNR).  The canyon walls in Pictured Rocks make it one of the most popular rock climbing areas in Eastern Iowa, with numerous routs and pre-set anchors for climbing ropes; the highest rock face is 75 feet (23m).

Maquoketa Caves State Park, a few miles upstream from Maquoketa protects a segment of the Driftless Area's karst topography, characterized by caves, ice caves and sinkholes.

See also
List of rivers of Iowa

References

External links

Univ. of Iowa: Bass on the Maquoketa
Smallmouth bass Retrieved July 18, 2007
Backbone State Park website

Rivers of Iowa
Tributaries of the Mississippi River
Driftless Area
Rivers of Fayette County, Iowa
Rivers of Clayton County, Iowa
Rivers of Delaware County, Iowa
Rivers of Jones County, Iowa
Rivers of Jackson County, Iowa